Třebelovice is a municipality and village in Třebíč District in the Vysočina Region of the Czech Republic. It has about 400 inhabitants.

History
The first written mention of Třebelovice is from 1365.

References

Villages in Třebíč District